Marie-Claude Sandrin (born  December 1937, in Bordeaux) is a French writer.

Biography 
Two other novels will be published by the same house: La Cendre d’un été  (1971) and L’homme à chagrin  (1980).

Several critics have highlighted relationships with Chateaubriand, Mauriac, Gracq, whom Marie-Claude Sandrin considers to be her "family".

Marie-Claude Sandrin also held a career in journalism and worked for twenty years in the Méridional, as well as in numerous magazines.

Works 
 Novels
1967: La Forteresse de boue, Buchet/Chastel
1971: La Cendre d’un été, Buchet/Chastel
1980: L’Homme à chagrin, Buchet/Chastel
 Essays
1980: Salut Baby, dialogue between a mother and her teenage daughter, .
1991: Champions de Dieu, recueil de témoignages de « rencontres avec Dieu » , Arléa
1995: Mon compagnon de misère, testimony collected from a former alcoholic, Éditions n°1

References

External links 
  Sandrin (Marie-Claude) Champions de Dieu (compte rendu) on Persée
 Salut Baby ! by Marie-Claude Sandrin on Library thing

20th-century French novelists
Writers from Bordeaux
1937 births
Living people
20th-century French women writers